Johar Al Kaabi (born 9 June 1988) is a Qatari footballer. He currently plays as a defender .

Al Kaabi played for Qatar at the 2005 FIFA U-17 World Championship in Peru.

Club career statistics
Statistics accurate as of 21 June 2012

1Includes Emir of Qatar Cup.
2Includes Sheikh Jassem Cup.
3Includes AFC Champions League.

References

External links 
FIFA.com profile
Goalzz.com profile

Qatari footballers
Living people
1988 births
Al-Arabi SC (Qatar) players
Al-Wakrah SC players
Qatar Stars League players
Qatari Second Division players
Association football defenders